The Rialto is an independent poetry magazine and poetry publisher. The magazine is published three times a year. It is part-funded by Arts Council England. First published in April 1984 in Norwich, Norfolk. The name was a result of a friend enquiring on "what news on the Rialto?" referring to progress with the publication and is a reference to William Shakespeare's The Merchant of Venice.

Background
Michael Mackmin, John Wakeman and Jenny Roberts were the co-founders of the magazine, however Jenny Roberts left shortly after the seventh issue was produced. The initial print run was financed by an anonymous private source. The first edition included poetry by Margaret Atwood, George Barker, Steve Sant, Gavin Ewart and Miroslav Holub, and four poems by Carol Ann Duffy who went on to become Poet Laureate from 2009 to 2019.

In 1996 The Rialto made its first foray into book publishing, producing a limited run of "How it turned out" by Frank Redpath. Shortly after this John Wakeman left the magazine and moved to Cork in Ireland, where he started his poetry magazine The Shop. Michael Mackmin continues to be editor of the magazine, and has also presided over the publication of books and "Bridge Collections"; a series of pamphlets intended as a step towards a first collection, more of both are planned.

The Rialto is run by a network of staff. Michael Mackmin continues to act as editor, with editions also produced by assistant editors Will Harris, Rishi Dastidar, Edward Doegar and Degna Stone, and guest editors such as Ella Frears and Daljit Nagra. Matthew Howard, Michael Mackmin and Nick Stone are Trustees, Nick Stone is also the art director.

The Rialto has an Advisory Board consisting of Rishi Dastidar, Matthew Howard, Colin Hughes, Claire Kidman, Michael Mackmin Esther Morgan and Nick Stone.

Cover art has included the likes of Barbara Hepworth, Patrick Sutherland, Paula Rego, Angie Lewin, Dee Nickerson and Eric Ravilious, as well as many pieces by new print-makers, artists and photographers.

Pamphlets

The Sea Turned Thick As Honey – Holly Singlehurst (2021)
Queerfella – Simon Maddrell (2020)
Fridge – Selima Hill (2020)
Dodo Provocateur – Anita Pati (2019)
you are mistaken - Sean Wai Keung (2017)
Cold Fire - Anthology (2017)
The Rainbow Faults - Kate Wakeling (2016)
Wound - Richard Scott (2016) Out of Print
Unmapped - Emily Wills (2014)
What I Saw - Laura Scott (2014)
The Pair of Scissors That Would Cut Anything - Luke Samuel Yates (2013)
A Bad Influence Girl - Janet Rogerson (2012)
The Hungry Ghost Festival - Jen Campbell (2012)
The Hitcher - Hannah Lowe (2011)
The Night is Young - Peter Sansom (2009)
Developing the Negative - Emily Wills (2008)
The Magnolia - Richard Lambert  (2008)
Bye for Now - Lorraine Mariner (2005)

Books
Gall - Matt Howard (2018) (Winner of "Best first collection" in the 2020 Laurel Prize)
The Swan Machine - Dean Parkin  (2016)
Night Lightning - Julia Casterton (2007)
Outswimming the Eruption - Allan Crosbie (2006)
Billack's Bones - Joanna Guthrie (2007)
The Prize - John Siddique (First Edition 2005, Second Edition 2006)
The Doves of Finisterre - Julia Casterton (2003, out of print)
Starlight on Water - Helena Nelson (2003)
2nd - Andrew Waterhouse (2002)
Scarberry Hill - Josephine Dickinson (2001)
Diverting the Sea - Emily Wills (2000)
in - Andrew Waterhouse (2000, out of print)
How it turned out - Frank Redpath (1996)

References

External links
 

1984 establishments in the United Kingdom
Literary magazines published in the United Kingdom
Magazines established in 1984
Mass media in Norwich
Poetry literary magazines
Triannual magazines published in the United Kingdom